Chevrolet Nexia may refer to:

 Daewoo Cielo, sold in Uzbekistan from 1996 to 2016 as the Daewoo Nexia
 Chevrolet Aveo (T200), sold in Uzbekistan from 2016–present as the Ravon Nexia in Russia

Nexia